The Arris and Gale Lecture, named for Edward Arris and John Gale, is an awarded lectureship of the Royal College of Surgeons. The first lecture was delivered by Sir William Blizard in 1810.

Origin
In I646 Edward Arris, an Alderman of the City of London, established a lecture on muscle anatomy. John Gale, a surgeon, later made a donation for a lecture (Gale anatomy lecture) on the anatomy of bones, the first of which was delivered by Clopton Havers in 1694. The two lectures were combined in 1810, to form the Arris and Gale Lecture, encompassing all human anatomy and physiology. The first lecture was delivered by Sir William Blizard in 1810.

Lecturers

References 

Annual events in London
British lecture series
Medical lecture series
Royal College of Surgeons of England